Hercules is a line of ARM architecture-based microcontrollers from Texas Instruments built around one or more ARM Cortex cores.  This "Hercules safety microcontroller platform" includes series microcontrollers specifically targeted for Functional Safety applications, through such hardware-base fault correction/detection features as dual cores that can run in lock-step, full path ECC, automated self testing of memory and logic, peripheral redundancy, and monitor/checker cores.

This line includes the TMS470M, TMS570 and RM4 families. These families were "Designed specifically for IEC 61508 and ISO 26262 safety critical applications". However, they differ significantly in the degree of support for these safety standards:

TMS470
Value Line Transportation and Safety MCUs
Supports Safety for
IEC 61508 systems
RM4
High Performance Industrial and Medical Safety MCUs
Developed to Safety Standards
IEC 61508 SIL-3
TMS570 
High Performance Transportation and Safety MCUs
Developed to Safety Standards
IEC 61508 SIL-3
ISO 26262 ASIL D
In particular, TMS570 support for ASIL D is accomplished through dual lock-step cores.

See also 
IEC 61508 (Functional Safety Standard)
ISO 26262 (Automotive Functional Safety Standard)
Qorivva, a comparable 32-bit PowerPC safety microprocessor line from Freescale

References

External links
 Hercules Safety ARM MCUs 

ARM-based microcontrollers
Texas Instruments microcontrollers